Ding Chengfang was a Chinese educator and politician. She was among the first group of women elected to the Legislative Yuan in 1948.

Biography
Originally from Fuyang County in Anhui Province, Ding attended , after which she became headteacher of Anhui Provincial Central Experimental Primary School. She joined the Kuomintang and became a member of the committee of its women's section in Anhui.

In the 1948 elections to the Legislative Yuan, Ding was a candidate in Anhui Province and was elected to parliament. Although she relocated to Keelung in Taiwan during the Chinese Civil War, she later returned to the mainland with her children and settled in Nanjing. She resigned from the Legislative Yuan in 1951. She subsequently became headteacher of Nanjing No. 19 Middle School and died during the 1980s.

References

Date of birth unknown
Chinese schoolteachers
Members of the Kuomintang
20th-century Chinese women politicians
Members of the 1st Legislative Yuan
Date of death unknown